is a Sanriku Railway Company station located in Miyako, Iwate Prefecture, Japan.

Station layout
Haraigawa Station has a side platform serving a single track. A small shelter is provided on the platform.

History
Haraigawa station opened between Toyomane Station and Tsugaruishi Station on 23 March 2019, simultaneously completed to reconstruct a section of Yamada Line between Miyako Station and Kamaishi Station and its transfer to Sanriku Railway's Rias Line.

Adjacent stations

Surrounding area
  National Route 45

References

Railway stations in Iwate Prefecture
Rias Line
Railway stations in Japan opened in 2019